"Be Yourself and 5 Other Cliches" is the second single from hard rock supergroup Rock Star Supernova and was released on the band's self-titled debut album.

Rock Star: Supernova
The song is only one of four tracks from the album that were performed on the reality show, Rock Star: Supernova. On the show, the song was first performed by Toby Rand.

Jimmy Kimmel Live!
The band performed the song on the late-night American television talk show, Jimmy Kimmel Live!.

External links
 Rock Star Supernova official band site

2006 singles
2006 songs
Songs written by Butch Walker
Song recordings produced by Butch Walker